King Lear is a 1916 silent film based on the 1606 play, directed by Ernest C. Warde and starring his father, the noted stage actor Frederick Warde. The film is one of a spate of Shakespearean films produced at the time to coincide with the 300th anniversary celebrations of William Shakespeare's death.

Cast
Frederick Warde as King Lear
Ernest Warde as The King's Fool
Ina Hammer as Goneril
Wayne Arey as The Duke of Albany
Edith Diestal as Regan
Charles Brooks as The Duke of Cornwall
Lorraine Huling as Cordelia
J.H. Gilmour as The Earl of Kent
Boyd Marshall as The King of France
Hector Dion as Edmund
Edwin Stanley as Edgar
Robert Whittier as Oswald

Plot
The synopsis provided by the studio in The Moving Picture World was:

Preservation status
King Lear survives and was preserved by George Eastman House. It can be found on home video and or DVD.

See also
Macbeth (1916)
Richard III (1912)

References

External links

1916 films
American silent feature films
Films based on King Lear
Thanhouser Company films
American black-and-white films
Articles containing video clips
Silent American drama films
1916 drama films
Pathé Exchange films
Films directed by Ernest C. Warde
1910s American films